Ack du min moder (Alas, thou my mother), originally written Ach! du min Moder, is one of the Swedish poet and performer Carl Michael Bellman's best-known and best-loved songs, from his 1790 collection, Fredman's Epistles, where it is No. 23. The collection is ostensibly of drinking-songs, but they vary in character from laments to pastorales, often simultaneously realistic and elegantly rococo in style. The song has two parts, despairing and celebratory: it begins as a lament, with Jean Fredman lying drunk in a Stockholm gutter outside the Crawl-in tavern, and repeatedly cursing his mother for conceiving him. Then he goes in, is revived by a stiff drink, and repeatedly thanks his mother and father for his life.

The epistle is subtitled  (A soliloquy in which Fredman lay outside the Crawl-in Tavern, right by the Bank, one summer night in the year 1768). The epistle's "soliloquy" was described by the critic Oscar Levertin as "the to-be-or-not-to-be of Swedish literature". Fredman was a real character, a watchmaker, but in Bellman's depiction he is an unemployed drunkard.

The song's themes include burlesque and social realism. It has strong biblical echoes from the books of Job and Jeremiah, and from the Psalms, reflecting a Lutheran background. The song touches on the philosophical debate about whether children are like their fathers or take after both parents.

Context

The song "Ack du min moder" was according to the musicologist James Massengale most likely written in the first half of 1770. It is recorded in Petter J. Hjelm's songbook, which was compiled between July 1770 and July 1771. Early shilling prints are recorded from 1772 and 1775.

Song

Music and verse form 

"Ack du min moder" is a song with six verses of twelve lines each, the last line being repeated as a refrain after a phrase on the flute. It is sung to a melody in  time, marked Menuetto (Minuet, a French social dance for two people). The rhyming pattern is ABAB-CCD-EED-FF. Many of Bellman's melodies are adapted from well-known French tunes, but the origin of this song's melody is unknown.

Lyrics 

The performance begins as a lament, as Fredman lies drunk in a Stockholm gutter outside the Crawl-in Tavern, cursing his parents for conceiving him. He goes into enough despairing detail to include a curse on the carpenter who made the "four-poster bed" (paulun), unless it was "perhaps upon a table" that he was brought into being:

  / flauto... /  
 You should've had lock and bar / for your virginity. / flute... / for your virginity.

He imagines telling his mother that she should have locked and barred her door against his father. Then the sun starts to warm him, and at last the tavern door opens, and he can go inside:

 
 But the pub door is opening, the shutters are undone; no-one in the town is (yet) dressed.

He staggers down the steps to the bar.

 
 Where's my cloak? / Ah, here's the staircase / Down to Bacchus's room.

His creaking joints are "lubricated" with a stiff drink, and he comes round to thanking his mother and father for his life.

  
 Now my stiff limbs will be lubricated, / all lubricated at once.

The song thus traverses the emotions from an alcoholic's suicidal despair to delight in life. The formal structure of the verses reflects these moods, with the blessing in the final section replacing the initial cursing. For example, verse 2 has four lines beginning  ("A curse upon"); verse 6 has three lines beginning  ("Thanks"), picking up the last line of verse 5.

Reception 

"Ack du min moder" is described by The Bellman Society as one of the most admired epistles, travelling as it does from the emotional depths of the gutter to the skies in the most drunken state of bliss. When the epistle is performed, it is to the public's "delight" as a "masterpiece". Anders Ringblom, writing in the cultural newspaper Tidskrift, calls the epistle an unvarnished picture of the old watchmaker as the rising sun warms him up, the tavern opens, and life once again becomes worth living. The scholar of literature Lars Lönnroth notes that all of this gives ample room for an entertainingly burlesque performance. The virtuoso soliloquy was accordingly described by the poet and literary historian Oscar Levertin at the end of the 19th century as "the to-be-or-not-to-be of Swedish literature".

Analysis

Biblical echoes 

Lönnroth commented that Bellman, in this as in other epistles, manages to combine a "low" burlesque approach with a genuinely mythic gaze that goes far beyond parody, awakening his audience's empathy for the portrayed figure. He notes that no. 23 is the first epistle in which Fredman is presented alone, and indeed it is subtitled a soliloquy. Fredman bemoans his fate, recalling to Lönnroth the biblical Job's complaints against God with phrases like "tired I tread my path". Other scholars including  and  have seen similarities to Job's complaints against God, noting that while the song is not one of Bellman's biblical parodies, he surely had the Bible in mind.

Indeed, Fredman seems, writes Lönnroth, to have the male point of view that it is always the woman who tempts, as in the Garden of Eden, and the man who helplessly falls for the temptation. Fredman sees his conception as a sin, suggesting that he was perhaps made "on a table", not in his parents' marital bed, hinting, Lönnroth notes, at the brutal picture painted in epistle 25, "Blåsen nu alla", where the woman  ("struggles and quivers on a table"). The priestly tone is reinforced when Fredman admits "I am a heathen, [my] heart, mouth, and strength worship the god of wine". Then the tone changes, Fredman  ("shall gird myself up") in yet another biblical echo – God commands Job "Gird up now thy loins" – drinks, and is refreshed. The scholar of Swedish literature Helene Blomqvist comments that Epistle 23 recalls the psalms that complain of suffering, especially those about the "suffering righteous", such as psalms 22, 38, and 69. The song is, she writes, structured like those psalms, while "the whole poem echoes biblical language, biblical motifs, Christian faith and Christian culture".

The scholar of literature  writes that whereas Bellman's plan had been to portray "Saint Fredman" as a sort of Saint Paul for the Bacchus cult, the biblical allusion in this "celebrated poem" is Old Testament rather than New. He notes that the "soliloquy" of the song's subtitle often had a religious connotation in the 18th century, and compares the Epistle to Jeremiah's lament:

The song's title, too, echoes another verse of Jeremiah,  ("Woe is me, my mother, that thou hast borne me").
The biblical allusions continue in the second, rejoicing half of the poem; Janzon notes that  could mean "anointed with the oil of gladness" (as for example in ), though Fredman means with brandy instead.

Social realism 

Alongside the biblical overtones, Lönnroth states that the poem is powerfully social-realist, almost, he writes, "like an social justice reportage on rough sleepers in Stockholm's slums", as when in the third verse Fredman curses his old shoes, his ragged coat, and his blackened shirt, complains of his body's itching, and calls "come and help me up". Bellman's biographer Carina Burman comments that Ulla Winblad may have been a heavenly beauty, but most of Bellman's men look really dreadful. The lyrics may be realistic, but the song is not literally true in every detail: Burman notes that the real Fredman died in the spring of 1767, but he is lying in the gutter outside the tavern in the summer of 1768, while in Epistle 79, Charon i Luren tutar, the fictional Fredman dies in 1785.

The monologue of Epistle 23, Lönnroth observes, turns out to be the first in a series depicting the social injustice, disease, and misery in Gustavian Stockholm; examples include no. 30, "To father Movitz, during his disease, consumption", and no. 35, Bröderna fara väl vilse ibland, "On his muse and her instability".

Helene Blomqvist sees Bellman's approach as a very Lutheran way of presenting simple, sinful people as "pleasant and lovable". Like Luther, she writes, Bellman sees the holy not in the cathedral but in ordinary life, at table, in the bedroom, or even in the pub or the gutter outside it. Some researchers have, she writes, puzzled over Bellman's piety, but the scholar of Swedish literature Sven Thorén had shown that his viewpoint was "old Lutheran": closer, in Blomqvist's view, to Martin Luther himself than to the dry orthodoxy of his followers.

Aristotelian inheritance 

Holmberg points out another curious feature of the song: the word just in Just till min faders säng. Du första gnistan till mitt liv uptände; ("just to my father's bed. You lit the first spark of my life"). Holmberg wonders why it would matter which man his mother had conceived Fredman with, namely, whether that differently-conceived son would still have been Fredman. It was then a matter in dispute. In the classical era, Hippocrates had proposed that both the mother and the father produced seeds which combined to form the embryo, whereas Aristotle had argued that form came entirely from the father, while the mother contributed only matter. In the 17th century, Descartes still shared this view, whereas Harvey's observations of eggs gave women a major role. Leeuwenhoek's observations of spermatozoa made it seem that men contributed more, as the living homunculus, containing a preformed human, joined the merely material egg. In the 18th century, Buffon began with an Aristotelian viewpoint but moved towards the egg hypothesis. Holmberg notes that Epistle 27 indicates that Fredman thought he was shaped by his father:  ("Feel there [in my face and limbs] my father, feel there his spirit"); and that Bellman may have chosen to characterise Fredman as holding an old-fashioned viewpoint.

Performances 

The first recording of the song was made by Sven-Bertil Taube in 1960.
It appears on the 1969 studio album Fred sjunger Bellman by Fred Åkerström, re-released on CD in 1990, and in a different style on his album Glimmande Nymf. It has also been recorded on the actor Mikael Samuelson's Sjunger Fredmans Epistlar, by Peter Ekberg Pelz, and by the musician and composer Martin Bagge.

References

Sources

 
 
 
  (contains the most popular Epistles and Songs, with sheet music)
 
  (with facsimiles of sheet music from first editions in 1790, 1791)

External links 

 Text of Epistle 23 on WikiSource (in Swedish)
 Text of Epistle 23 on Bellman.net (in Swedish)

1790 compositions
Swedish songs
Fredmans epistlar